Eggby is a locality situated in Skara Municipality, Västra Götaland County, Sweden with 231 inhabitants in 2010.

References 

Populated places in Västra Götaland County
Populated places in Skara Municipality